Achiet-le-Petit is a commune in the Pas-de-Calais department in northern France.

Geography
A farming village located 13 miles (21 km) south of Arras, at the D27 and D9 road junction.

History
 In 1700, Charles Jacques Adrien de Mullet, seigneur of Wancquetin demolished the remains of the small castle, knocking down the motte and filling in most of the moat. He then built a chateau, using white bricks and stones, enclosed by large garden walls.
 In 1749 the castle was completed by the laying out of a wide terrace (500' long by 40' wide) on which there were two guns donated by Louis XV. During the French Revolution, the cannons were melted down and thrown down a well. In the 19th century, they were found and returned to the Diesbach family.
 In 1789, the castle was looted and destroyed during the Revolution, leaving no trace of the edifice. The stones and bricks of the castle were used by the locals to construct homes which were in turn destroyed during World War I.
 In the 19th century, the land stolen and sold during the French Revolution was restored to the Diesbach family.
 The commune was involved in the theatre of operations of the Battle of Bapaume (1871), during the Franco-Prussian War.
 After World War I, the town was awarded the Croix de Guerre.

Population

Sights
 The church of St.Martin, dating from the twentieth century.

See also
Communes of the Pas-de-Calais department

References

External links

 A personal site about Achiet-le-Petit

Communes of Pas-de-Calais